Pratap Pothen (13 August 1952 – 15 July 2022) was an Indian actor and filmmaker who acted in about 100 films and directed 12 films. He appeared in Malayalam, Tamil and Telugu as well as Hindi films. He also worked as a scriptwriter and producer for films.

Early life and career
Pratap was born in Trivandrum, Kerala on 13 August 1952. His father Kolathinkal Pothan was a businessman who died when Pratap was 15 years old. Pratap had five siblings, including an elder brother, Hari Pothan, who also worked as a film producer.

Pratap was educated at the Lawrence School, Lovedale in Ooty. Initially, he was interested in painting; however, once he joined college, he started acting in plays with the help of his friends, and gradually got more interested in acting than painting. After his graduation from the Madras Christian College, Pratap worked as a copywriter in an ad agency in Mumbai. Later he also worked at Sistas ad agency and Hindustan Thomson.

Personal life
Pratap married actress Raadhika in 1985, but their marriage did not last long and they separated in 1986. In 1990, he married Amala Sathyanath, with whom he had a daughter, Keya. Pratap and Amala got divorced in 2012.

Film career
Pratap worked with The Madras Players. After seeing Pratap's performance in Shaw's play Androcles and the Lion, Bharathan invited Pratap to appear in his Malayalam film Aaravam.

Pratap later starred in three more films: Thakara, Lorry and Chamaram.

He also acted in Tamil films such as Moodupani, Varumayin Niram Sivappu, Nenjathai Killathe, Panneer Pushpangal. His debut as a director was in Meendum Oru Kaathal Kathai, which he received a national award for. Prathap worked with Kamal Haasan in Vettri Vizhaa (1989). The film is noteworthy for being the first Tamil movie to use a steadicam.

Pratap created three more films in Malayalam Rithubhedam, Daisy, Oru Yathramozhi. His only Telugu film is Chaitanya and his only role in Bollywood is in Guru. His notable roles in Malayalam cinema include Once Upon A Time There Was A Kallan, Ayalum Njanum Thammil, 22 Female Kottayam, Idukki Gold, Ezra, Uyare, and Bangalore Days.

He directed Tamil films including Jeeva, Vettri Vizhaa, Seevalaperi Pandi and Lucky Man.

In 2006, Pratap Pothan announced that he would direct Madhavan in a script written by K. Rajeswar. Pre-production works proved to be difficult and the film went through several changes of title and lead actress, before it was announced that the film would be called Oru Naal Podhuma and would feature Rukmini Vijayakumar in the leading female role. The team had made plans to complete shooting for the film in Canada, though creative differences meant that the film was subsequently shelved.

In the last few years, he was busy with his ad agency named "Green Apple" and focused on commercials for MRF Tyres and Nippo. He used to host Naalaya Iyakkunar on Kalaignar TV.

The turn of the century saw him playing many gratifying roles in films like Priyasakhi, Aayirathil Oruvan and Ponmagal Vandhal. As a filmmaker, in Tamil, Telugu and Malayalam, he directed veterans like Sivaji Ganesan, Mohanlal, Kamal Haasan, Thilakan and Nagarjuna.

Death 
Pratap was found dead in his apartment in Kilpauk, Chennai on 15 July 2022. He is believed to have died of natural causes.

Awards and nominations

Filmography

As actor

As director

As writer
Solla Thudikuthu Manasu (1988)

Television
 Naalaya Iyakkunar (2019) (Kalaignar TV)

References

External links
 
 Prathap Pothen at MSI

1952 births
2022 deaths
20th-century Indian male actors
Filmfare Awards South winners
20th-century Indian film directors
Male actors from Thiruvananthapuram
Male actors in Malayalam cinema
Male actors in Tamil cinema
Indian male actors
Madras Christian College alumni
Tamil film directors
Male actors in Telugu cinema
21st-century Indian male actors
Malayalam film directors
Tamil film producers
Telugu film producers
Film directors from Thiruvananthapuram
Tamil screenwriters
Malayalam screenwriters
Screenwriters from Thiruvananthapuram
Director whose film won the Best Debut Feature Film National Film Award
South Indian International Movie Awards winners